Artur Awejde (March 1838 – August 29, 1863) was the Polish commissioner of Augustów Voivodeship during the January Uprising. He studied at the Saint Petersburg State University and was a primary school teacher in Łomża. During the January Uprising he served in the Reklecki troops. He was killed by Cossacks on August 29, 1863.

Bibliography 
 Adam Massalski, Nauczyciele szkół średnich rządowych męskich w Królestwie Polskim 1833–1862, Warsaw 2007, page 62

Saint Petersburg State University alumni
People from Łomża
1838 births
1863 deaths